Marc Fascher (born 4 August 1968 in) is a German football manager and former player, who last managed Sportfreunde Lotte.

Coaching career
Fascher began his coaching career with Harburger SC, before being named head coach at SC Concordia in 2000. He coached Concordia for four years before being named as the new head coach of Kickers Emden. In the 2004–05 season, his first with Kickers Emden, he led the club from Oberliga Nord to the Regionalliga Nord. He suddenly resigned his position on 1 June 2007, and after four months without a club he then signed a contract to coach Sportfreunde Siegen. He coached Siegen until 1 May 2008, and then spent seven months without a club.

Fascher signed a contract on 23 March 2009 as interim coach at Carl Zeiss Jena for the final four months of the 2008–09 season and was fired on 29 May 2009, after having saved the club from relegation out of the Regionalliga.

On 21 March 2010, he took over as head coach of SC Preußen Münster and led the club to promotion to the 3. Liga at the conclusion of the 2010–11 season. In January 2012, Fascher left Preußen Münster and was appointed coach of Hansa Rostock eight months later.

He was appointed as the new head coach of Sportfreunde Lotte on 27 July 2017. He was sacked on 1 November 2017.

References

External links

FC Carl Zeiss profile
Kicker profile

1968 births
Living people
Footballers from Hamburg
German footballers
Association football midfielders
SC Concordia von 1907 players
SC Victoria Hamburg players
Hamburger SV II players
German football managers
Kickers Emden managers
FC Carl Zeiss Jena managers
Sportfreunde Siegen managers
FC Hansa Rostock managers
SC Preußen Münster managers
3. Liga managers
Sportfreunde Lotte managers
West German footballers